Sebastiania chahalana is a species of flowering plant in the family Euphorbiaceae. It was described in 1968. It is native to Guatemala.

References

Plants described in 1968
Flora of Guatemala
chahalana